Love Eternal may refer to:

 "Love Eternal" (song), a single by Paul Haig
 Love Eternal (novel), a novel by H. Rider Haggard
Love Eternal (film), a film directed by Brendan Muldowney
L'Éternel retour, a French drama romance film, also known as Love Eternal
"A Love Eternal", a song by Joe Satriani from the album Super Colossal

See also
Eternal Love (disambiguation)